"Troublemaker" is an electropop song by British singer-songwriter Taio Cruz, released as the second single from his third studio album, TY.O. It was released in Germany on 9 December 2011 before being released in the United Kingdom as the album's lead single on 1 January 2012. The song was written and produced by Cruz, Steve Angello, Rami Yacoub and Carl Falk. Cruz performed the song on The Voice of Germany on 27 January 2012.

Background
In an interview with Billboard, Cruz claimed that fans could expect more uptempo dance tracks on his then-forthcoming album. He explained: "The new album will be out before Christmas. We'll have had a couple of singles before then, too. It's definitely going to be more of the uptempo, fun, energetic vibe that you've heard on 'Break Your Heart', 'Higher' and 'Dynamite'. There are also a few guests on the album – David Guetta and Ludacris, just to name two – but we have a couple more on there that will be big surprises."

Music video
The music video for Troublemaker was illegally leaked to YouTube on 7 October 2011 without an official premiere. The video features Cruz performing the song in a warehouse, surrounded by a series of female dancers against a white background. The clip also sees two Lamborghini Gallardos crash head first into a concrete wall, while Cruz performs the track in between them. The video lasts for a total length of four minutes and two seconds. The video was removed just hours after its leak, but was officially reinstated on 10 November 2011.

Track listing
 German CD single
 "Troublemaker" - 3:40
 "Troublemaker" (DJ Wonder Remix) - 4:27

 Digital download
 "Troublemaker" - 3:40
 "Troublemaker" (DJ Wonder Remix) - 4:27
 "Troublemaker" (Vato Gonzalez Remix) - 5:04
 "Troublemaker" (JWLS Remix) - 5:51

Charts and certifications

Weekly charts

Year-end charts

Certifications

Release history

See also
List of top 10 singles in 2012 (UK)

References

2011 singles
Taio Cruz songs
Songs written by Carl Falk
Songs written by Rami Yacoub
Songs written by Taio Cruz
Songs written by Steve Angello
Song recordings produced by Steve Angello
Island Records singles
Song recordings produced by Rami Yacoub
Song recordings produced by Carl Falk
2011 songs